Maheshpur is a village in West Champaran district in the Indian state of Bihar.

Demographics
As of 2011 India census, Maheshpur had a population of 2,660 in 473 households. Males constitute 52.5% of the population and females 47.4%. Maheshpur has an average literacy rate of 44.81%, lower than the national average of 74%: male literacy is 61.74%, and female literacy is 38.25%. In Maheshpur, 11.72% of the population is under 6 years of age.

References

Villages in West Champaran district